Franciscus Plante (21 April 1613 (bapt.) – 1690) was a Dutch poet and chaplain.

Biography
Plante was born in Bruges and studied theology at Oxford. In October 1636 he travelled as personal chaplain with John Maurice of Nassau to the Dutch colony in Brazil, returning together in 1644. In 1647 became a minister in Strijen, in 1653 in Zevenbergen and in 1657 in Breda, where he remained until his death.  He is thought to have died in Breda.

In 1647, he finished a twelve-volume Latin epos called Mauritias (in Portuguese, Mauritiados), which in the first six volumes describes the activities of the Dutch West Indies Company from 1624 to 1634 and in the last 6 volumes praises  John Maurice's leadership from 1634 to 1641.  It was published in Amsterdam, and included twenty engravings that had already appeared in a work by Caspar Barlaeus, which had been published in the same year.  Four maps (Ceará, Pernambuco, Paraíba, and Pernambuco Borealá) and a portrait of John Maurice were also incorporated from Barlaeus’ work.   Plante later wrote Barlaeus' obituary in 1648.

Sources
 Obituary of Barlaeus, by Plante
 Historia naturalis Brasiliae 
W.A.P. Smit, Het Latijnse epos van Franciscus Plante, pp 238 – 241 of Kalliope in de Nederlanden. Het Renaissancistisch-klassicistische epos van 1550 tot 1850. Van Gorcum & Comp., Assen 1975-1983. (Dutch)

References

1613 births
1690 deaths
17th-century Dutch Calvinist and Reformed ministers
Poets of the Spanish Netherlands
17th-century male writers
Dutch male poets
Clergy from Bruges
Writers from Bruges